Polsat Play is a Polish lifestyle television channel aimed primarily at men. It is owned and operated by Polsat.

History 
On 6 October 2008, 6 April 2020, and August 30 2021 Polsat Play changed its logo and graphic design along with neighboring Polsat channels.

The logo was changed again, on August 30, 2021 with the major rebranding of Polsat Play and it's television channels.

Polsat Play also broadcasts some programmings from this channel.

Programming 

 Gliniarze
 Kołowrotek
 Magicy z ulicy
 Łowca pedofilów
 Emil pogromca mandatów
 Autościema
 Kloszard story
 Kolekcjonerzy
 Polacy za granicą
 Policjanci
 Górale
 Poszukiwacze historii
 Selekcja
 1000 rzeczy, które mężczyzna powinien zrobić w życiu
 120 mil na godzinę
 Przystanek Łaska
 Gadżety Salety
 Granice kariery
 Pięściarze
 Tajemnice polskiej mafii
 Terminator
 Malanowski i Partnerzy
 Drwale i inne opowieści Bieszczadu

External links

References

Polsat
Television channels in Poland
Television channels and stations established in 2008